For Love Not Lisa was an American hard rock band formed in the early 1990s in Oklahoma City, Oklahoma. They were signed to East West Records and Tooth & Nail Records. They released two albums in the 1990s before disbanding in 1996.

History 

For Love Not Lisa was formed in 1990 by vocalist and guitarist Mike Lewis and guitarist and vocalist Mike Miles. They recruited Matt Hillbin on bass guitar and Kent Euing on drums to round out the lineup for their early shows. In 1991, Kevin Jeffries replaced Hillbin on bass and Eric Myers replaced Euing on drums. The new lineup released a demo, For Love Not Lisa, in 1992. It contained four live songs and four studio songs. Their first major tour was as an opener for Rage Against the Machine. The band then signed to East West Records. The following year, another lineup shift happened, as Aaron Preston (from the band Chainsaw Kittens) replaced Myers on drums. In addition, midway through recording their album, Jeffries left the band and was replaced on bass by Doug Carrion who was already working on the album in the studio. The band released their debut album, Merge, in 1993 that was co-produced by Carrion. The songs "Softhand" and "Slip Slide Melting" were released as the album's singles. Both singles contained a cover of the Kiss song "Rocket Ride", and featured original songwriter Ace Frehley on vocals and guitars as a guest appearance.

In 1994 "Slip Slide Melting" was included on the soundtrack for The Crow. A music video that intertwined scenes from the film with shots of the band was created as well, and it had found occasional play on MTV's Headbangers Ball. Later in 1994, Carrion experienced difficulties while touring for Merge and then left the band. He was replaced by Clint McBay, who previously played with Preston in the band Chainsaw Kittens. The band then started to work on their second album, Information Superdriveway. Produced by Steven Haigler, it was released in September 1995, with the singles "Had a Lover" and "Good Intentions". The band self-funded a music video for "Coming Into Focus", but the record label ultimately refused to promote it as a single. The album failed to meet sales expectations. The band placed some of the blame on the label for neglecting to promote it. Shortly after the album's release, the label broke away from its parent, Atlantic Records, and started to operate closely under Elektra Records, who was known for their numerous internal shifts and also for neglecting their artists' marketing. In 1996, the band called it quits.

Lewis, Preston, and McBay formed the Christian rock band Puller, who signed to Tooth & Nail Records. Preston left Puller before they released their debut album and McBay eventually quit. At the end of the 1990s, Miles reunited with Lewis as he joined Puller as well. In 1999, while Puller was still signed to Tooth & Nail, the label released The Lost Elephant, a compilation that contained songs from For Love Not Lisa's earliest demo and alternate versions of select songs, along with a few unreleased tracks.

In the 2000s, Carrion would compose for numerous television shows, such as The Biggest Loser and Make It or Break It. He would also continue his relationship with Kottonmouth Kings on their studio albums, and with rapper Daddy X on his solo releases. Along with Bruce Fitzhugh, Lewis created a company named Zambooie that specialized in online merchandise for bands. Lewis also continued to front the band Puller for a number of years, being the band's only constant member. Along with joining Puller, Miles also formed a new band named Echo Division in 2005. Preston and McBay went on to form a new band named Dead Girlfriend after both had left Puller. McBay later went on to become a freelance editor.

In 2007, Lewis, Miles, and McBay attempted to reconvene in the studio to create new songs and to prepare for a few reunion gigs as For Love Not Lisa; however, neither plan fully materialized.

Members
Final
 Mike Lewis – vocals, guitar (1990–1996)
 Mike Miles – guitar, vocals (1990–1996)
 Aaron Preston – drums (1993–1996)
 Clint McBay – bass (1994–1996)

Former
 Matt Hillbin – bass (1990–1991)
 Kent Euing – drums (1990–1991)
 Kevin Jeffries – bass (1991–1993)
 Eric Myers – drums (1991–1993)
 Doug Carrion – bass (1993–1994)

Timeline

Discography
Albums
Merge, 1993 (East West Records/Atlantic)
Information Superdriveway, 1995 (East West Records)

Compilations
The Lost Elephant, 1999 (Tooth & Nail Records)

EPs/Singles
For Love Not Lisa EP, 1992 (Indivision)
"Softhand" single, 1992 (Theologian Records)
"Softhand" single, 1993 (East West Records)
"Slip Slide Melting" single, 1994 (East West Records)
"Good Intentions" single, 1994 (Theologian Records)
"Had a Lover" single, 1995 (East West Records)

References

American hard rock musical groups
American post-hardcore musical groups
East West Records artists
Musical groups disestablished in 1996
Rock music groups from Oklahoma
Tooth & Nail Records artists
Musical groups from Oklahoma City